Tango SA is a Luxembourgish telecom company that offers TV, Internet, fixed and mobile telephony services to residential customers, the self-employed and small businesses.

As of January 2018, Tango counted around 280,000 customers mainly located in Luxembourg, Belgium, France, Germany. The company has 9 outlet stores and 17 partner outlets. Tango has a partnership with Vodafone.

Tele2 sold Tango to Proximus Group in 2008, which also owns Telindus, another telecom company in Luxembourg, and both companies were brought together under one structure in October 2016.

Competitors

Tango is the second largest of Luxembourg's three main mobile telecommunications operators. It competes with Orange Luxembourg (formerly VOX mobile) and POST Luxembourg.

Tango TV
Tango TV propose 4 formulas: S, Luso, L and XL, and thematic TV bouquets. Tango provide a similar French-language channels line-up with its Belgian counterpart Proximus Pickx.

S
It is the basic offer, which include essential channels with Cartoon Network and Disney premium channels.

 Al Jazeera
 ARD 
 Baby TV
 BBC Entertainment
 Bloomberg
 C8 
 Cartoon Network
 Chamber TV
 CNBC Europe 
 CNews
 CStar 
 Disney Channel (DE)
 Disney Channel (FR) 
 Disney Junior (DE) 
 Disney Junior (FR)
 Euronews
 FashionTV
 Fix & Foxi
 Fox (DE) 
 France 2 
 KTO
 La Une 
 Lëtz Kanal
 M6 
 Mediaset Italia
 Melody
 National Geographic 
 National Geographic Wild
 National Geographic (DE) 
 ProSieben 
 Record TV 
 RFM TV
 RTL Nitro
 RTL 
 RTL Télé Lëtzebuerg 
 RTL Zwee 
 RTL Zwei 
 RTPi
 Sat.1 
 Sat.1 Gold 
 Studio 100 TV 
 Super RTL 
 TF1 
 TVE Internacional 
 TVI Internacional
 ZDF

L 
S channels +:

 3sat 
 AB3 
 ABXplore
 Action 
 Arte 
 BBC World News
 Bibel TV
 BR Fernsehen
 ARD-alpha
 Canal 24h 
 Club RTL 
 CNN 
 Deutsche Welle
 DMAX
 Eurosport 1
 France 24 (EN)
 France 24 (FR) 
 France 3 
 France 4 
 France 5 
 Histoire TV
 Hr-fernsehen
 Kabel eins 
 KiKa
 La Trois 
 LCI 
 MDR Fernsehen
 Mezzo Live HD
 MTV Europe
 N-tv
 NDR Fernsehen
 One
 Phoenix
 Plug RTL 
 ProSieben Maxx 
 Radio Bremen TV
 Rai 1
 Rai 2
 Rai 3
 Rai News24
 Rai Scuola
 Rai Storia
 RBB Fernsehen
 RTL 4
 RTL 5
 RTL 7
 RTL 8
 Sixx 
 SR Fernsehen
 SWR Fernsehen
 Tagesschau24
 Tele 5
 Tipik 
 TMC 
 Trek 
 TV Breizh 
 TV5Monde 
 Ushuaïa TV 
 VOX 
 VOXup
 W9 
 WDR Fernsehen
 Welt 
 ZDFinfo
 ZDFneo

Luso
The Luso formula propose the S channels plus the bouquets Foot (Eleven Sports and Proximus Sports channels) and Portugal.

XL
It propose all L channels and one extra: one bouquet or 2 VoDs per month.

Bouquet Foot
Eleven Sports 
Eleven Pro League 
Proximus Sports

Bouquet Family
13ème Rue
Boomerang
Canal J
E!
Gulli 
Mangas
Syfy 
TCM Cinéma
TiJi

Bouquet Portugal
Benfica TV 
Eurosport 1 (PT)
Globo Internacional 
Porto Canal
RTP3
SIC Internacional
SIC Notícias
Sporting TV
TVI Ficção

Bouquet Sport & Discovery
Animaux
Automoto
Discovery 
Eurosport 1 (FR) 
Eurosport 1 (PT) 
Eurosport 2 (FR) 
Eurosport 2 (PT)
Eurosport News
Extreme Sports
National Geographic Wild 
National Geographic

Bouquet Charme
Dorcel XXX
Passie XXX
Penthouse 
Pink X

References

 https://www.tango.lu
 https://www.telindus.lu
 https://www.proximus.com/

Proximus Group
Vodafone
Telecommunications companies established in 1998
Telecommunications companies of Luxembourg